Jakob Gauermann (1773, Oeffingen – 1843, Miesenbach) was a German landscape and genre painter and engraver born in Oeffingen, near Stuttgart.

Life
He at first worked as a stonemason at Hohenheim. His strong inclination for drawing brought him to the knowledge of Charles Eugene, Duke of Württemberg, who enabled him to receive an education in art at the Karlsschule Stuttgart. After this he travelled for six years in Switzerland. In 1798 he went to Vienna. He visited Tyrol and Styria, where he made sketches, which he worked up into water-colour drawings and oil pictures. He also executed several etchings of landscapes.

Gauermann died in Vienna in 1843 and was buried in Hundsturmer Cemetery. His grave has since been moved.

See also 
 list of German painters

References

External links 

1773 births
1843 deaths
People from Fellbach
German male painters
18th-century German painters
18th-century German male artists
19th-century German painters
German engravers
German emigrants to Austria
Austrian male painters
19th-century Austrian painters
19th-century German male artists
Austrian engravers